Bakulu people (also Ikolu, Ikulu, Bekulu) are a people found in Zangon Kataf, Kachia and Kauru Local Government Areas of southern Kaduna State of Middle Belt, Nigeria. They speak a Plateau language called Kulu. They call their land Akulu.

Religion
A majority of the Bakulu people were reportedly adherents of traditional religion, numbering about 29.5% of the entire population, while Muslims number 0.5% and Christians with 70.0% of the population. Among the Christians, Independents have 60.0%, Protestants 15.0% and Roman Catholics 45.0%.

Politics
The paramount ruler of the Bakulu people is addressed as "Agwom" (or Agam). The current monarch is His Highness (HRH) Agwom Yohanna Sidi Kukah, Agwom Akulu II Brother, Bishop Mathew Hassan Kukah. The Agwom Akulu is the head of the Akulu Traditional Council of Akulu (Ikulu) Chiefdom, whose headquarters is at Fadan Ikulu in Kamuru.

Land subdivisions
The land of the Bakulu people is known as Akulu (Hausa: Ikulu). Ikulu is one of the 11 subdivisions of Zangon Kataf Local Government Area of southern Kaduna State. It is in turn divided into the following:
Anchuna
Ungwan Akokah
Gidan Pate
Gidan Zomo
Kamaru Ikulu (Kamuru)
Kamaru Hausawa (Kamuru)
Katul
Kamuru Dutse
Kurmi Biri
Ungwan Jada
Ungwan Jatau
Katul Crossing
Ugwan Rana
Ungwan Pa (Ashafa Gida)
Ungwan Sani
Yadai
Akupal
Ungwan Gauta
Ungwan Rimi (Ghidol)
Fadan Ikulu (Ansang)
Gidan Ali (Ginkpon)
Fansil (Antang)
Ungwan Makama
Ampaga (Boto, Lisuru)
Ashafa (Agwenshe)
Gidan Bako (Gunyua)
Dutsen Bako (Gekon'Unyua)
Anzaah

A prominent Bakulu son, Rev. Fr. Matthew Kukah decried in an interview with This Day News that the Bakulu alongside the Anghan are the smaller of the groups in the local government with each having just a ward only despite their numbers.

Notable people
 Bishop Matthew Hassan Kukah, Bishop of Roman Catholic Diocese of Sokoto
 Late Hon. (Chief) Charles Garba Ali Madaki, Politician, Former Minister Federal Ministry of Works and Housing
 Hon. Ali Wakili, Politician, Former House of Assembly Member, Kaduna State
 Hon. Allahmagani Yohanna, Politician, Former Commissioner Culture and Tourism, KEPA, Local Government and Chieftaincy. The last political appointment was the PPS of the Late His Excellency Patrick Yakowa Kaduna State Governor
 Prof. Joseph Mamman, Ahmadu Bello University, Zaria
 Mr. Ishmail Yusuf Ashafa Asst Director FCDA
 Prof. Abdullahi Musa Ashafa, Former Ag. Vice-Chancellor (Academic) Kaduna State University, Kaduna
 Prof. Benjamin Chindo, Former Dean Faculty of Pharmacy (Academic) Kaduna State University, Kaduna
 Hon. Ben Bako, Politician, Former commission for Information and Home Affairs, Kaduna State
 Barr. (Chief) Joseph Maimagani, Seasoned Administrator and Lawyer
 Prof. Aje Tokan, Abubakar Tafawa Balewa University, (ATBU) Bauchi

References

Ethnic groups in Nigeria